Hector Craig (1775January 31, 1842) was an American manufacturer and politician from New York. He served two non-consecutive terms in the  U.S. House of Representatives from 1823 to 1825, and from 1829 to 1830.

Life
Born in Paisley, Scotland in the Kingdom of Great Britain, he was the son of James Craig. Craig came to the United States in 1790 and settled with his family in Orange County, NY. James Craig founded the hamlet of Craigville in the Town of Blooming Grove, and built a paper mill. Hector Craig later built a grist mill and a saw mill. 

In 1797, he married Sarah Chandler, and their daughter was Sarah Agnes Craig who married in 1828 William F. Havemeyer, later three times Mayor of New York City.

Congress 
Hector Craig was elected as a Jacksonian Democratic-Republican to the 18th United States Congress, holding office from March 4, 1823, to March 3, 1825. 

He was elected again as a Jacksonian to the 21st United States Congress, holding office from March 4, 1829, to July 12, 1830, when he resigned.

Later career and death 
On March 22, 1831, he was appointed by Secretary of the Treasury Samuel D. Ingham as one of three Commissioners of Insolvency for the Southern District of New York He was Surveyor of the Port of New York from 1833 to 1839, appointed by President Andrew Jackson.

He was buried at a private cemetery on the Caldwell estate in Blooming Grove.

Notes

References

An Outline History of Orange County by Samuel Watkins Eager (page 546)
The American Almanac and Repository of Useful Knowledge for the Year of 1833 (page 102)

External links

1775 births
1842 deaths
People from Blooming Grove, New York
Politicians from Paisley, Renfrewshire
Democratic-Republican Party members of the United States House of Representatives from New York (state)
Jacksonian members of the United States House of Representatives from New York (state)
19th-century American politicians
Members of the United States House of Representatives from New York (state)